"Power" is a song by English singer Ellie Goulding, released as the second single from Goulding's fourth studio album Brightest Blue, through Polydor Records on 21 May 2020. It was written by Goulding and its producers Jonny Coffer and Jamie Scott. Digital Farm Animals, Lucy Taylor and Jack Tarrant were added to the songwriting credited because the song interpolates English singer Dua Lipa's song "Be the One" (2015). David Paich was also added because of the verse's similarity to the Toto song "Georgy Porgy" (1979).

Background and release

On 19 May, Goulding posted a video on social media with a quote "Are you running out of power?" The video shows a cell phone interface.  The following day, she announced the song's title and release date; its cover art was also posted that day. The singer self-shot the song’s accompanying video from her home while in lockdown in London. It features Goulding dressed in various outfits in split screen, full shots and selfies.

Music video
The music video for "Power", directed by Imogen Snell and Riccardo Castano, was released on 21 May 2020. Goulding self-shot the song’s accompanying video from her home while in lockdown in London, which features her dressed in various outfits in split screen, full shots and selfies.

Charts

Release history

References

2020 singles
Ellie Goulding songs
Songs written by Digital Farm Animals
Songs written by Ellie Goulding
Songs written by Jamie Scott
Songs written by Jonny Coffer
Songs written by David Paich